Daesiella is a monotypic genus of melanoblossiid camel spiders, first described by John Hewitt in 1934. Its single species, Daesiella pluridens is distributed in Namibia.

References 

Solifugae
Arachnid genera
Monotypic arachnid genera
Taxa described in 1934